The  is a skyscraper in Toyama City, Japan. 

Construction of the 111-metre, 22-storey building was finished in 1994.

As of 2011, the building was the tallest structure in Toyama Prefecture.

Buildings and structures completed in 1994
Skyscrapers in Japan
Buildings and structures in Toyama Prefecture
Toyama (city)
1994 establishments in Japan
Mitsubishi Estate